Attila Abonyi (born 16 August 1946 in Budapest) is a former Hungarian-born Australian soccer manager and player and played for the Australia national team.

Abonyi made his senior international debut for Australia in 1967 at age 20, and had earned 61 caps, including appearing in the 1974 World Cup; Australia's first entry into the World Cup. In his first nine matches for Australia, he scored eleven goals all coming from the 1967 South Vietnam Independence Cup. He scored his first of three international goals against New Zealand in November 1967.

Early life
Attila Abonyi was born and raised in Budapest, Hungary. Abonyi did not play regular football in Hungary, as he could not play junior competitive football until the age of twelve. He migrated from Budapest to Melbourne at age 10 after the Hungarian Revolution of 1956. He started playing for the St Kilda junior club when he turned 11 years old. He moved to his home club Melbourne Hungaria at age 14 until he made the senior team in 1962.

Club career
Born in Hungary, he took up football after emigrating to Australia at age 10 in 1957. Attila played his senior debut for Melbourne Hungaria in 1962 at 15 years of age in the old Victorian State League. In 1967 Abonyi was a key player in helping the club achieve their first ever State League title. He was the top goalscorer for that season with 31 goals in 29 games, and he scored the goal that won them the title. In that same year Abonyi was man of the match in helping Melbourne Hungaria win the Australian Cup, with a hat-trick, to defeat the favoured APIA Leichhardt 4-3 in extra-time. This turned out to be his final season with Melbourne Hungaria.

He moved to Sydney and joined St. George-Budapest between 1969 and 1976 where he was part of three NSW State League titles, before finishing his career with Sydney Croatia between 1977 and 1979. In June 1975, Abonyi made a guest appearance for a touring Manchester United side, coming on as a substitute for David McCreery against Queensland. He scored United's third goal in a 3–0 win.

International career
Abonyi made his debut for Australia in May 1967 when he played against Scotland. The national team traveled to Vietnam for a friendship tournament where scored a hat-trick on debut against New Zealand, and then scored another hat-trick in his second match against Singapore a few days later.

He is well known for being a member of the Australian 1974 World Cup squad in West Germany and also represented New South Wales and Victoria. He scored 25 international goals for Australia in 61 games between 1967 and 1977 making him tied as the fifth highest goal scorer for Australia. He made a total of 88 appearances for Australia and scored 36 goals.

Managerial career
After retiring in 1979 Abonyi switched to coaching at the state level after taking on the player-coach for the 1978 and 1979 seasons. Sydney Croatia won the minor premierships in those two years. Abonyi then moved to Melita as a coach only, where they won the minor premiership and lost the grand final. He was then offered a full-time job with Riverwood, the only full-time coaching position in the state league at the time. In his first season they finished seventh and then runners-up in 1982 on goal difference to Sydney Croatia.

He moved to Canberra in 1983 and coached Canberra City in the National Soccer League (NSL). For the 1984 season Sydney Croatia in their first season in the NSL offered Abonyi the head coach position, which he accepted (as his family had remained in Sydney). He was sacked halfway through the season because of poor results and high expectations by the board. In 1987 and 1988 and assisted Frank Arok at St. George who were in the NSL. After the 1988 season, Abonyi moved away from Sydney and football (soccer).

Honours
 Melbourne Hungaria
 Victorian State League Championship: 1967
 Australia Cup: 1967

 St George-Budapest
 NSW State League Premiership: 1972, 1976
 NSW State League Championship: 1971, 1974, 1975

 Sydney Croatia
 NSW State League Premiership: 1977, 1978, 1989
 NSW State League Championship: 1977

Abonyi Place in the Sydney suburb of Glenwood is named for him. Abonyi made a lap of honour on the MCG at half time of the 1998 World Cup qualifier against Iran.

Personal life
Abonyi now lives in Coffs Harbour on the north coast of New South Wales.

Career statistics

Club

International

References

External links
 Australian Players Database at Ozfootball.

1946 births
Living people
Footballers from Budapest
Hungarian emigrants to Australia
Australian soccer players
Australia international soccer players
1974 FIFA World Cup players
Parramatta FC managers
Sydney United 58 FC players
Parramatta FC players
Association football wingers
Australian soccer coaches
Sydney United 58 FC managers